Corrin is a heterocyclic macromolecule, it forms the "core" of vitamin B12 and is also related to the porphyrin ring in hemoglobin.

Corrin may also refer to:

 Corrin (surname)
 Corrin (Dune), a place in the Dune universe
 Corrin (Fire Emblem), the main character of the video game Fire Emblem Fates
 Corrin (Kerry), a 332m peak in the Slieve Mish Mountains